Warrington Arpley railway station was a station located on the south side of Wilson Patten Street, Warrington, England at the junction of St Helens Railway and Warrington and Stockport Railway. It opened on 1 May 1854; and it closed to passengers on 5 September 1958. Both railways were absorbed by the LNWR. The station was on the southmost Liverpool to Manchester line.

References

Sources

External links
 Warrington Arpley at Disused Stations

Disused railway stations in Warrington
Former London and North Western Railway stations
Railway stations in Great Britain opened in 1853
Railway stations in Great Britain closed in 1868
Railway stations in Great Britain opened in 1871
Railway stations in Great Britain closed in 1958